All Saints Academy is an independent preparatory school located in Winter Haven, Florida that is affiliated with the Episcopal Church. Grades serviced within the school range from Pre-Kindergarten, at age 3, through the twelfth grade. The school is located on a 60-acre campus located between Winter Haven and Lakeland.

History

All Saints Academy was founded in 1966 as St. Paul's Episcopal Parish School under Father Gilbertson and Father Sturrup of Saint Paul's Episcopal Church. The school did not adopt its current name until 1993, when the middle and upper school portions of the facility were added. In 1997 Dr. Maryly Van Leer Peck lead the school and during her tenure, it extended the grades serviced to grade twelve, had their first graduating class finished their education in 1997 with a 100% graduation rate.

Academic Ratings

Since 1997, a total of 15 All Saints students have been named National Merit Scholarship semifinalists.

References

Private high schools in Florida
Private middle schools in Florida
Private elementary schools in Florida
Buildings and structures in Winter Haven, Florida
Schools in Polk County, Florida